Leifur James is a London-based experimental producer, composer and vocalist known for his esoteric avant-garde style. In 2018, his critically acclaimed debut album A Louder Silence was released on Night Time Stories, which was followed by a second album Angel In Disguise in June 2020.

Career 
Since beginning his career with his debut album A Louder Silence in 2018, Leifur James garnered critical attention, occupying the space between experimentation and introspection. Support on the airwaves came from leading radio presenters Tom Ravenscroft, Mary Anne Hobbs and Gilles Peterson on BBC6 Music, Young Turks label show on NTS and Bradley Zero & Charlie Bones on Worldwide FM. Soon after the album a remix EP followed with cutting edge reworks from up and coming talent across the electronic music spectrum. This included remixes from Bruce, FaltyDL and Whities producer Coby Sey, leading to praised reviews from music publications Resident Advisor, Pitchfork, Mixmag, Electronic Sound, Future Music UK.

In February 2020, James announced his follow up album Angel of Disguise on Late Night Stories. Leading up the release of Angel In Disguise, British electronic music magazine DJ Mag premiered the album's fourth single Ritual describing the track as feeling "indebted to Burial’s nightbus-tailored garage, while wavering synth cries and cinematic pianos". A very well received album earned the place as 'Album Of The Month' by Future Music for a "magnificent record" by "a singular artist who revels in playing with boundaries" and a review from Crack Magazine stating that "Angel In Disguise certainly demonstrates James' skill as a producer". Upon the album's full release, Vinyl Factory dubbed it as "melancholic electronica", solidifying James' sonic development from the more upbeat A Louder Silence.

Although key to his creative process, visual media took centre stage in a collaboration with Hungarian director, Balázs Simon. Premiered on Boiler Room's '4:3' platform, known for showcasing the best in new moving visual media, Wurlitzer was then nominated for a UK Music Video Award. The masterful blend of James' harmonic vocals and Simon's powerful visuals earned the duo widespread support from CLASH Magazine, Director's Notes, Motionographer, the London Short Film Festival and the UK and Berlin Music Video Awards. Further showcasing his visual ability, James shared a series of photographs with Mixmag to accompany his 'Club Epiphany Tracks' from around the early years of the previous decade (2010s). In an intimate interview with ÂUGHT Magazine leading up to the release of Angel In Disguise, James discusses his musical influences and the importance of his experiences of free thinking while in education and turning an unfortunate event into a blessing.

As a live performer, James has taken his fusion of Jazz and experimental soundscapes to festivals including Bluedot, The Great Escape, We Out Here, Sundaze and Nova Batida.  James supported German composer Pantha du Prince at a sold-out concert in the main Barbican Hall before selling out a string of his own live shows across Europe including the Southbank Centre in London - a highlight of his career so far. He was set to tour his new live electronic show for the release of Angel In Disguise in May 2020, via a string of intimate shows across the U.K. and further afield in mainland Europe, beginning in Copenhagen before heading to Berlin and then finishing in London. His touring schedule has been postponed and is set to resume Autumn 2021.

In 2021, James' music video "Angel in Disguise", directed by Balázs Simon, was nominated for Best Experimental at the Berlin Music Video Awards.

Discography

Albums 
 A Louder Silence (2018)
 Angel in Disguise (2020)

EPs 
 A Louder Silence: Remixes (2019)

Singles 
 "Wurlitzer" (2019)

References

External links 

Leifur James Website

Living people
English male composers
English record producers
Musicians from London
Year of birth missing (living people)
Night Time Stories artists